Qaleh-e Ali Baba (also Romanized as Qal‘eh-ye ‘Alī Bābā) is a village in Howmeh Rural District, in the Central District of Lamerd County, Fars Province, Iran. At the 2006 census, its population was 133, in 31 families.

References 

Populated places in Lamerd County